Solla Solla Inikkum is a 2009 Tamil-language film directed by G. Murailappas, who earlier directed Raasi.The film stars Navdeep, Madhumitha, and Mallika Kapoor in lead roles. Prakash Raj, Suja, Sara Alambara, Santhanam, Livingston,  and Ashish Vidyarthi play other supporting roles in this film. The film was launched on 14 May 2008, released Summer 2009.

Plot
Sathya (Navdeep), the son of Vijayakumar, completes his degree and spends time with friends Guru (Abhinay) and Sathyan (Sathyan), among others. Life goes uncomplicated until he meets Anjali (Sara Alambra). What starts as friendship develops into love. When he proposes to her, she turns it down, saying that it was only friendship and nothing more than that. Next comes Meghna (Suja), and what starts as love between them ends the same. Meghna insists they part as lovers as it was all timepass for her. Sathya comes across Radhika (Madhumitha). They become close friends, and so is Guru with her. When Sathya decides to inform Radhika about his desire to marry her, she throws a bombshell by saying that she and Guru are in love with each other. Guru takes her for a ride. After using her, he deserts her. Sathya steps in and ensures that both get married. Guru seeks solace with Bhadri Narayanan (Prakash Raj). A do-gooder and influential man in the society, he takes sides with Guru. Sathya goes hammer and tongs and ensures that all ends well. Also enters Anu (Mallika Kapoor) in his life.

Cast

 Navdeep as Sathya
 Madhumitha as Radhika
 Mallika Kapoor as Anuradha
 Prakash Raj as Bhadri Narayanan
 Abhinay as Guru
 Suja Varunee as Megha
 Sara Alambara as Anjali
 Livingston as Jayaraman
 Alex
 Ashish Vidyarthi as Madhiyazhagan
 Vijayakumar as Sathya's father
 Devadarshini as Bhadri's wife
 Charle as Police officer
 Sathyan as Sathyan
 Meera Krishnan as Guru's mother
 Sriranjini as Sathya's mother
 Mohan Raman as Sathya's father's friend
 Bava Lakshmanan as Margil 
 Bharathi Kannan

Soundtrack 
The soundtrack was composed by Bharadwaj.

Release 
Rediff gave the film two out of five stars and noted that "Solla Solla Inikkum has good principles and starts out meaning well and were it not for the dull and clichéd presentation, might have actually stood a chance of clicking with its audience". Behindwoods gave the film a rating of one-and-a-half out of five stars and wrote that "Everything including the production values and the performances look plastic in the movie announcing the hollowness of the script and the banality of the screenplay. Arthur Wilson’s camera comes as a saving grace while [Bharadwaj's] music is just earsplitting". The television premiere was occurred on March 28' 2010 @4pm.

References

External links
 

2009 films
2000s Tamil-language films
Films scored by Bharadwaj (composer)